"Ella Se Hizo Deseo" (English: She Made a Wish) is a song by Puerto Rican salsa recording artist Tito Rojas, from his eighth studio album, Sensual (1990). It was composed by Gustavo Marquez, produced by Julio Merced and Antonio Moreno, and released as the lead single from the album in 1990.

In 2013, the song peaked at number 83 on the Billboard Mexico Popular Airplay chart. It was re-recorded with Puerto Rican recording artist Ivy Queen in 2015 for her ninth studio album, Vendetta.

Charts

References

1990 songs
1990 singles
Tito Rojas songs
Ivy Queen songs
Spanish-language songs
Salsa songs